Iceleak is an Italian-Luxembourgish DJ/Producer duo created by Nelson Tordera (born 9 December 1989 in Milan, Italy) and Filippo Gorla (born 17 July 1993 in Luxembourg, Luxembourg).

Music career

Early career 
Nelson graduated in composition at the Milan Conservatory, and has since then written soundtracks for fashion shows, as well as performed at various events in the fashion industry. His soundtracks and DJ sets include several luxury brands like Dolce & Gabbana, Calvin Klein, Cartier, Yves Saint Laurent, Jacob Cohen, Escada, Blauer, Kiton, Gianvito Rossi, Meissen Couture, Zanellato, Kickers, etc.

Filippo started Iceleak after producing music for a successful Luxembourgish electro-dubstep duo named Dead C∆T Bounce which counts more than 3 million plays on SoundCloud, 1 million views on YouTube and has performed in numerous European clubs and festivals like Rock-A-Field, Social Club Paris, Rockhal, etc.

Present career 
Iceleak's first single, "Danger", was released on Disco Fries' label Liftoff Recordings. Their follow up releases, "Don't Leave Me", and "Wavy", were released on Tiësto's label AFTR:HRS/Musical Freedom, and on Spinnin' Records respectively. Iceleak collaborated with singer Karl Michael to perform vocals for both "Danger" and "Don’t Leave Me". The lyrics to "Wavy" were written by Joe Killington. Later, Iceleak released "Something In The Water", their first single with Ultra Music Records, which was written by Jenson Vaughan and featured vocals by Craig Smart and followed up with "Fighting Mirrors" on ChillYourMind with lyrics written by Victoria Horn and sang by Jack Hawitt. Most recently, Iceleak released "Anywhere" with lyrics written and sang by Kye Sones on KnightVision Records.

Discography

Singles

Mixes
Guest on Tiësto Club Life podcast #597 (8 September 2018)

References

External links

 

Living people
Italian record producers
Electronic musicians
Tropical musicians
Ultra Records artists
Spinnin' Records artists
Year of birth missing (living people)